William E. L. Bunn (1910-2009) was an American artist.

He was born in 1910 in Muscatine, Iowa. He studied with Grant Wood, and received bachelor's and master's degrees from the University of Iowa.</ref> During the 1930s, he received commissions for post office murals throughout the Midwest, awarded by the Section of Painting and Sculpture.

Works include:
Mural at the Minden United States Post Office (NRHP-listed) completed in 1939.
Mural at United States Post Office and Courthouse (Dubuque, Iowa) (NRHP-listed contributing building)
Mural at the Hickman, Kentucky, post office, NRHP-listed contributing building in Old Hickman Historic District, Hickman, Kentucky
Mural at the Hamburg, Iowa post office

See also
List of post office murals

References

20th-century American painters
1910 births
2009 deaths
People from Muscatine, Iowa
American male painters
20th-century American male artists
Painters from Iowa
University of Iowa alumni
Federal Art Project artists